The 1915 Invercargill mayoral election was held on 28 April 1915 as part of that year's local elections. This was the first election for a biennial term.

Incumbent mayor Duncan McFarlane was re-elected with a reduced majority to a third consecutive term.

Results
The following table gives the election results:

References

1915 elections in New Zealand
Mayoral elections in Invercargill